Marylyn Chiang (born 1977) is a Canadian former swimmer who won two silver medals at the 2000 FINA Short Course World Championships in Athens, Greece. She has held Commonwealth, US Open, NCAA and Canadian records in backstroke and butterfly, including the Canadian 100m backstroke record for 9 years. In her collegiate career, she led a resurgence in University of California, Berkeley's swimming program, when she won the first NCAA title for the school in the sport in eleven years.  In so doing, she set an NCAA record.  Further, won the first of five consecutive Pacific-10 Conference female swimmer of the year honors for the Golden Bears in 1999.  Haley Cope would win in 2000, and Natalie Coughlin three times in a row, from 2001 to 2003. In 2009, Marylyn was inducted in Cal Berkeley's Sports Hall of Fame.

References

External links
  University of California, Berkeley Year book entry

1977 births
Living people
California Golden Bears women's swimmers
Canadian female backstroke swimmers
Medalists at the FINA World Swimming Championships (25 m)